Octopus djinda is a species of octopus in the order Octopoda. Octopus djinda inhabits the swallow waters in southwest Australia and is caught by fisheries for food. Before its reclassification in 2021, it was considered to be conspecific with O. tetricus.

Reference 

Octopodidae
Molluscs described in 2021